Matěj Kozubek (born 11 May 1996) is a Czech marathon swimmer. He competed in the 2020 Summer Olympics.

References

1996 births
Living people
Czech male swimmers
Olympic swimmers of the Czech Republic
Swimmers at the 2020 Summer Olympics
Competitors at the 2015 Summer Universiade